Dahir Riyale Kahin  (born 12 March 1952) is a Somaliland politician who was President of Somaliland from 2002 to 2010. He previously served as a senior officer in the National Security Service in Somalia, and he was Vice President of Somaliland from 1997 to 2002.

Personal life
Kahin was born in the town of Quljeed, situated in the northwestern Awdal region of Somaliland. He hails from the Jibreel Younis sub-clan of the Gadabuursi clan. He was educated in Amoud, and was later trained in Mogadishu.

Career

Early career
Kahin's previous posts included a diplomatic position at the Somali Embassy in Djibouti.

In the last years of the Siad Barre government, during the 1980s, Kahin was the highest-ranking National Security Service (NSS) officer in Berbera. He was stationed in Las Anod in 1981 to 1982.

From 1997 to 2002, Kahin served as the Vice President of Somaliland.

President of Somaliland
On 3 May 2002, Kahin became the third President of Somaliland, after the death of the self-declared republic's President Muhammad Haji Ibrahim Egal. Kahin later won the elections on 14 April 2003, representing the Ururka Dimuqraadiga Umada Bahawday (UDUB), or United Democratic People's Party. He was sworn into office on 16 May, the day after Egal's funeral.

In 2008, Kahin established by decree new regions and districts, which drew criticism. Regions and districts in Somaliland are not just an instrument for the organisation of local government, they are also used as electoral districts. Kahin's move was considered by several to have motives rooted in electoral and clan-politics. Moreover, as these new regions and districts were never geographically delimitated, they argued that he saddled the region with a legacy that hampers the efficient organisation of local government to this day.

Throughout his tenure as President of Somaliland, Kahim sought to maintain peace and tranquility in the region. His administration contributed to various state-building and institutional development initiatives. In terms of democratization, his government also successfully organized local council elections, parliamentary elections, and two presidential elections. Additionally, Kahin is noted for having peacefully transferred power to his successor in office, President Ahmed Mohamed Mohamoud.

References

External links
 (Brief history of Somaliland)
 waayaha.net
 

|-

1952 births
21st-century presidents of Somaliland
21st-century Somaliland politicians
Gadabuursi
Living people
People from Awdal
Presidents of Somaliland
Somaliland politicians
United Peoples' Democratic Party politicians
Vice presidents of Somaliland